Drama in a Gypsy Camp near Moscow is a 1909 Russian short film directed and written by Vladimir Siversen.

Plot 
Two young people are in love with the gypsy woman Aza. One of them, Aleko, gets a sympathy from Aza. He makes her an offer to get married and she agrees. Opponent of Aleko sends to him a cheater who during the game wins from Aleko all the money, horse and Aza.

References

External links 
 «Drama in a Gypsy Camp near Moscow» on kinopoisk.ru
 «Drama in a Gypsy Camp near Moscow» on kino-teatr.ru
 «Drama in a Gypsy Camp near Moscow» on Encyclopedia of Russian Cinema

1909 films
1900s Russian-language films
Russian silent short films
1909 short films
Russian black-and-white films
Films of the Russian Empire